Coming Home is a 2014 PBS special featuring a concert by Kristin Chenoweth. The concert was later made into a CD and DVD.

Concert and broadcast
In 2014, PBS asked Chenoweth to do a concert for a special. She chose to do it in her hometown of Broken Arrow, Oklahoma. The concert featured songs from her career, as well as songs she has enjoyed since her childhood. Chenoweth performed a duet of "For Good" with Broken Arrow resident Axyl Langford, and the Broken Arrow High School choir providing backup vocals in "Upon this Rock".

Chenoweth stated:  "I chose ‘My Coloring Book’ because when I was in college, my voice teacher didn’t think I understood the song, and told me to pull it out one day when I did.  So I’m singing it all these years later, and she was there to witness it.  I also like to reintroduce songs that people may not be familiar with, like Stephen Foster’s ‘Hard Times,’ which is from 1853 but sounds like it could have been written today.  And I love to do songs that people wouldn’t expect from me, like ‘Enough Is Enough.’" "I’m known for musical theatre,” she continues, “but I grew up with country and gospel, and I’ve always loved standards and operas.  So I figured that this live performance would be a good chance to show people the different things that influenced me and the different things I can do."

Beginning on November 28, 2014, the concert was aired on PBS stations nationwide, as Chenoweth's first concert on television. The special was part of the 2014 PBS Arts Fall Festival.

CD
On November 17, 2014, a live CD of the concert was released by Concord Records. There are two versions of the album, the regular one, and the Target version with three bonus tracks.

The album consists of the songs:
 I Could Have Danced All Night from My Fair Lady
 Maybe This Time from Cabaret
 My Coloring Book by John Kander and Fred Ebb
 Bring Him Home from Les Miserables
 Fathers and Daughters by Jodi Marr
 Hard Times Come Again No More by Stephen Foster
 Upon This Rock by Gloria Gaither and Dony McGuire
 Over the Rainbow from The Wizard of Oz
 Popular from Wicked
 For Good from Wicked
 Little Sparrow by Dolly Parton from her album Little Sparrow
 Wishing You Were Somehow Here Again from The Phantom of the Opera
 All the Things You Are from Very Warm for May
 No More Tears (Enough is Enough) (sung with Chelsea Packard) by Paul Jabara and Bruce Roberts
 I Was Here by Victoria Shaw, Gary Burr and Hillary Scott

 I Will Always Love You by Dolly Parton
 Heart of the Matter by Don Henley
 I'll Be Home for Christmas by Bing Crosby

The album peaked at No. 48 on the Billboard 200. selling 8,000 copies in the first week. 
The album has sold 47,000 copies in the United States as of August 2016.

Personnel
Lead Vocals- Kristin Chenoweth
Produced by- Jay Krugman
Recorded and mixed by- David Reitzas
Directed by- Kenny Ortega
Musically Directed by- Mary Mitchell Campbell
Mastered by- Paul Blakemore (from CMG Mastering)
Featured Vocals- Tyler Hanes, Chelsea Packard, Axyl Langford, Will Taylor, Mary-Mitchell Campbell
Additional Vocals- Broken Arrow High School Choir
Broken Arrow High School Show Choir directed by- Justin Rosser
Guitar- Eric Davis
Bass- Brian Hamm
Drums- Damien Bassman
Percussion- Steve Craft
Violin- Justin Smith, Michelle Sherman
Cello- Krassimira Figg
Woodwinds- Reid Bennett, Gary Linde
Trumpets- Dave Johnson, Steven Goforth
Orchestrations- Oran Elder
Additional Orchestrations- Matt Aument, William David Brohn, Bruce Coughlin, Mary-Mitchell Campbell
Lighting & Sound Design- Matt Berman
Stage Managed by- Rocky Noel
Music Contractor- Rich Fisher
Music Consultant- Jill Dell'Abate
Hair and Makeup- Jon Lieckfelt
Outfits- Idra Alta Moda, Houta Hippie, Barbara Kaiser
Photography- Jill Solomon, James Gibbard

DVD
The DVD of the concert was released on February 3, 2015. Like the concert, the DVD includes Chenoweth's Father's Day video from 2014. It also shows some behind the scenes footage of the making of the concert, CD, DVD and PBS special.

Charts

References

Kristin Chenoweth albums
2014 albums